Iraj Amir-Akhori (born 5 October 1962) is an Iranian former cyclist. He competed in the road race at the 1988 Summer Olympics.

References

External links

1962 births
Living people
Iranian male cyclists
Olympic cyclists of Iran
Cyclists at the 1988 Summer Olympics
Place of birth missing (living people)
20th-century Iranian people